Derby Junction Football Club were an amateur football club in Derby, England. They were active in the 1880s and 1890s, notably being founder members of the Midland League in 1890 and FA Cup semi-finalists in 1888. They played at Derby Arboretum.

History

Derby Junction first developed as an old boys' team for Junction Street School, and were renamed Derby Junction Street in 1885, at some point dropping 'Street'. Reports suggest the team began playing at some point in the early 1880s, although the club claimed a foundation date of 1870. In 1882 the club's colours were red and navy blue thin stripes on the shirt with white shorts and navy socks, however by 1890 they had switched to a green shirt with a gold sash, white shorts, and green socks. They folded in 1895 as professionalism began to spread into the game.

Their run to the F.A. Cup semi-finals came in the 1887–88 season. They won all of their ties in the early rounds by one goal margins, received a bye in the fourth round, then beat Welsh side Chirk to secure their place in the last eight. They were drawn against the holders, Blackburn Rovers. The team spent a week at Matlock Baths to prepare for the tie, which was paid for by public subscription.  With a bumpy and icy pitch acting as a leveller, the Juncs pulled off an unexpected 2-1 win to reach the last four. Their run came to an end in the semi-finals when they lost to eventual winners West Bromwich Albion.

Full F.A. Cup Results
1884 - 1885:

1885 - 1886:

Note: The results archive on the official F.A. website shows Darwen as the home team for both the original tie and the replay. 

1886 - 1887:

1887 - 1888: 

1888 - 1889: 

1889 - 1890: 

1890 - 1891:

Source:

References

Defunct football clubs in Derbyshire
Sport in Derby
Association football clubs disestablished in 1895
1895 disestablishments in England
Defunct football clubs in England